Elaphoidella is a genus of freshwater copepods in the family Canthocamptidae. It contains over 200 species, including three classified as vulnerable species by the IUCN – three endemic to Slovenia (Elaphoidella franci, Elaphoidella jeanneli and Elaphoidella slovenica) and one endemic to the United States (Elaphoidella amabilis). In total, the genus Elaphoidella contains the following species:

Elaphoidella aberrans Chappuis, 1954
Elaphoidella affinis Chappuis, 1933
Elaphoidella africana (Cottarelli & Bruno, 1994)
Elaphoidella aioii Chappuis, 1955
Elaphoidella algeriensis Rouch, 1987
Elaphoidella amabilis Ishida in Reid & Ishida, 1993
Elaphoidella anatolica Chappuis, 1953
Elaphoidella angelovi Mikhailova-Neikova, 1969
Elaphoidella angirmii Löffler, 1968
Elaphoidella apicata Chappuis, 1950
Elaphoidella apostolovi Wells, 2007
Elaphoidella aprutina Pesce, Galassi & Apostolov, 1987
Elaphoidella arambourgi Chappuis, 1936
Elaphoidella armata (Delachaux, 1918)
Elaphoidella balcanica Apostolov, 1992
Elaphoidella balkanica Apostolov, 1992
Elaphoidella bidens (Schmeil, 1894)
Elaphoidella birsteini Borutsky, 1948
Elaphoidella bisetosa Apostolov, 1985
Elaphoidella bispina Dussart, 1984
Elaphoidella borutzkyi Mikhailova-Neikova, 1972
Elaphoidella botosaneanui Petkovski, 1973
Elaphoidella boui Rouch, 1988
Elaphoidella bouilloni Rouch, 1964
Elaphoidella brehieri Apostolov, 2002
Elaphoidella brevicaudata Apostolov, 2002
Elaphoidella brevifurcata Chappuis, 1954
Elaphoidella brevipes Chappuis, 1935
Elaphoidella bromeliaecola (Chappuis, 1928)
Elaphoidella bryophila Chappuis, 1928
Elaphoidella bulbifera Chappuis, 1937
Elaphoidella bulbiseta (Apostolov, 1998)
Elaphoidella bulgarica (Apostolov, 1991)
Elaphoidella cabezasi Petkovski, 1982
Elaphoidella caeca Miura, 1964
Elaphoidella californica M. S. Wilson, 1975
Elaphoidella calypsonis Chappuis & Rouch, 1959
Elaphoidella capiteradiata Brehm, 1951
Elaphoidella carterae Reid in Reid & Ishida, 1993
Elaphoidella cavatica Chappuis, 1957
Elaphoidella cavernicola Apostolov, 1992
Elaphoidella cavicola Shen & Tai, 1965
Elaphoidella chappuisi Rouch, 1970
Elaphoidella charon Chappuis, 1936
Elaphoidella claudboui Apostolov, 2003
Elaphoidella cliffordi Chappuis, 1932
Elaphoidella coiffaiti Chappuis & Kiefer, 1952
Elaphoidella colombiana Gaviria, 1993
Elaphoidella cornuta Chappuis, 1931
Elaphoidella coronata (G. O. Sars, 1904)
Elaphoidella cottarellii Pesce & De Laurentiis, 1996
Elaphoidella crassa Chappuis, 1954
Elaphoidella crassicaudis Chappuis, 1936
Elaphoidella crenobia Petkovski, 1973
Elaphoidella croatica Petkovski, 1959
Elaphoidella cuspidata Chappuis, 1941
Elaphoidella cvetkae Petkovski, 1983
Elaphoidella cvetkovi Mikhailova-Neikova, 1967
Elaphoidella czerkessica Borutsky, 1972
Elaphoidella damasi Chappuis, 1938
Elaphoidella damianae Wells, 2007
Elaphoidella decorata (Daday, 1901)
Elaphoidella denticulata Chappuis, 1929
Elaphoidella derjugini (Rylov, 1932)
Elaphoidella dispersa Chappuis, 1934
Elaphoidella einslei Petkovski, 1981
Elaphoidella elaphoides (Chappuis, 1923)
Elaphoidella elegans Chappuis, 1931
Elaphoidella elegantula (Chappuis, 1931)
Elaphoidella elgonensis Chappuis, 1936
Elaphoidella elongata Chappuis, 1950
Elaphoidella eucharis Chappuis, 1953
Elaphoidella federicae Pesce & Galassi, 1988
Elaphoidella femurata Basamakov, 1987
Elaphoidella fluviusherbae Bruno & Reid in Bruno et al., 2000
Elaphoidella fonticola Chappuis, 1937
Elaphoidella franci Petkovski, 1983
Elaphoidella ganeshi Reid, 1998
Elaphoidella garbetensis Rouch, 1980
Elaphoidella gordani Karanovic, 1998
Elaphoidella gracilis (G. O. Sars, 1863)
Elaphoidella grandidieri (Guerne & Richard, 1893)
Elaphoidella hallensis Kiefer, 1963
Elaphoidella helenae Chappuis, 1953
Elaphoidella hellmichi Löffler, 1968
Elaphoidella hirsuta Chappuis, 1945
Elaphoidella humboldti Löffler, 1963
Elaphoidella humphreysi Karanovic, 2006
Elaphoidella hyalina Chappuis, 1932
Elaphoidella incerta Chappuis, 1937
Elaphoidella infernalis Rouch, 1970
Elaphoidella insularis Chappuis, 1956
Elaphoidella intermedia Chappuis, 1931
Elaphoidella iskrecensis Apostolov, 1997
Elaphoidella italica Pesce, Galassi & Apostolov, 1987
Elaphoidella jakobii M. H. Nogueira, 1959
Elaphoidella janas Cottarelli & Bruno, 1993
Elaphoidella jasonis Chappuis, 1953
Elaphoidella javaensis (Chappuis, 1928)
Elaphoidella jeanneli (Chappuis, 1928)
Elaphoidella jochenmartensi Dumont & Maas, 1988
Elaphoidella jojoi Petkovski, 1982
Elaphoidella juxtaputealis Damian & Botosaneanu, 1954
Elaphoidella karamani Chappuis, 1936
Elaphoidella karllangi Petkovski, 1973
Elaphoidella kenyensis Chappuis, 1936
Elaphoidella kodiakensis M. S. Wilson, 1975
Elaphoidella labani Löffler, 1973
Elaphoidella laciniata (Douwe, 1911)
Elaphoidella laevis Chappuis, 1950
Elaphoidella leruthi Chappuis, 1937
Elaphoidella limnobia Chappuis, 1938
Elaphoidella lindbergi Chappuis, 1941
Elaphoidella longifurcata Chappuis & Kiefer, 1952
Elaphoidella longipedis Chappuis, 1931
Elaphoidella longiseta Chappuis, 1932
Elaphoidella mabelae Galassi & Pesce, 1991
Elaphoidella madiracensis Apostolov, 1998
Elaphoidella malayica (Chappuis, 1928)
Elaphoidella margaritae Pesce & Apostolov, 1985
Elaphoidella marjoryae Bruno & Reid in Bruno et al., 2000
Elaphoidella massai Chappuis, 1936
Elaphoidella mauro Chappuis, 1956
Elaphoidella michailovae Basamakov, 1970
Elaphoidella millennii Brancelj, 2009
Elaphoidella minos Chappuis, 1956
Elaphoidella miurai Chappuis, 1955
Elaphoidella montenegrina Karanovic, 1997
Elaphoidella moreae Pesce, 1982
Elaphoidella necessaria Kiefer, 1933
Elaphoidella negroensis Kiefer, 1967
Elaphoidella neoarmata Petkovski, 1973
Elaphoidella neotropica Petkovski, 1973
Elaphoidella nepalensis Ishida, 1994
Elaphoidella nuragica Pesce & Galassi, 1986
Elaphoidella nyongi Roen, 1956
Elaphoidella pandurskyi Apostolov, 1992
Elaphoidella pani Por, 1983
Elaphoidella paraelaphoides Pesce, Galassi & Apostolov, 1987
Elaphoidella parajakobii Reid & José, 1987
Elaphoidella paraplesia Kiefer, 1967
Elaphoidella parapostolovi Wells, 2007
Elaphoidella parelaphoides Pesce, Galassi & Apostolov, 1987
Elaphoidella parvifurcata Petkovski, 1983
Elaphoidella pectinata (Delachaux, 1924)
Elaphoidella pescei Apostolov, 1986
Elaphoidella petrovae Apostolov, 1986
Elaphoidella phreatica (Chappuis, 1925)
Elaphoidella pintoae Reid & José, 1987
Elaphoidella plesai Pesce & Galassi, 1994
Elaphoidella plutonis Chappuis, 1938
Elaphoidella prohumboldti Petkovski, 1983
Elaphoidella propedamasi Defaye & Heymer, 1996
Elaphoidella proserpina Chappuis, 1934
Elaphoidella pseudocornuta Dumont & Maas, 1988
Elaphoidella pseudojeanelli Pónyi, 1956
Elaphoidella pseudophreatica Sterba, 1956
Elaphoidella putealis (Chappuis, 1925)
Elaphoidella pyrenaica Rouch, 1970
Elaphoidella quadrispinosa Chappuis, 1938
Elaphoidella quemadoi Petkovski, 1982
Elaphoidella radkei Reid, 1987
Elaphoidella reducta Rouch, 1964
Elaphoidella reedi M. S. Wilson, 1975
Elaphoidella rodriguensis Borutsky, 1969
Elaphoidella romanica Kulhavy, 1969
Elaphoidella rossellae Pesce, Galassi & Apostolov, 1987
Elaphoidella sabanillae Petkovski, 1982
Elaphoidella salvadorica Ebert, 1976
Elaphoidella schubarti Chappuis, 1936
Elaphoidella serbica Petkovski & Brancelj, 1988
Elaphoidella sewelli (Chappuis, 1928)
Elaphoidella shawangunkensis Strayer, 1989
Elaphoidella silverii Pesce, 1985
Elaphoidella silvestris M. H. Lewis, 1972
Elaphoidella similis Chappuis, 1931
Elaphoidella simplex Chappuis, 1944
Elaphoidella siolii Kiefer, 1967
Elaphoidella slovenica Wells, 2007
Elaphoidella spinosa Chappuis, 1952
Elaphoidella stammeri Chappuis, 1936
Elaphoidella striblingi Reid, 1990
Elaphoidella stygia (Apostolov, 1989)
Elaphoidella suarezi Reid, 1987
Elaphoidella subcrenobia Petkovski, 1983
Elaphoidella subgracilis (Willey, 1934)
Elaphoidella subplutonis Pesce, Galassi & Apostolov, 1987
Elaphoidella subterranea (Apostolov, 1991)
Elaphoidella superpedalis Shen & Tai, 1964
Elaphoidella surinamensis (Delachaux, 1924)
Elaphoidella synjakobii Petkovski, 1983
Elaphoidella tarmani Brancelj, 2009
Elaphoidella taroi Chappuis, 1955
Elaphoidella tenera Chappuis, 1937
Elaphoidella thienemanni Chappuis, 1931
Elaphoidella trisetosa Chappuis, 1933
Elaphoidella turgisetosa Petkovski, 1983
Elaphoidella uenoi Chappuis, 1958
Elaphoidella unica Kiefer, 1931
Elaphoidella unidens (Menzel, 1916)
Elaphoidella uva Karanovic, 2001
Elaphoidella vaga Chappuis, 1950
Elaphoidella valkanovi Basamakov, 1973
Elaphoidella vandeli Chappuis & Rouch, 1958
Elaphoidella varians Chappuis, 1955
Elaphoidella vasiconica Rouch, 1970
Elaphoidella vietnamica Borutsky, 1967
Elaphoidella wilsonae Hunt, 1979
Elaphoidella winkleri (Chappuis, 1928)

References

Harpacticoida
Taxonomy articles created by Polbot